NEQSOL Holding is an international group of companies. Most companies of the group are active in the fields of energy, telecommunications, construction and high-tech.

It was founded by Azerbaijani Nasib Hasanov. The holding first started in the oil and gas sector, and then expanded to additional fields of activity by acquiring new companies. The holding now includes Vodafone Ukraine, Bakcell, Azercell Telecom, Caucasus Online, Nobel Oil Group, Nobel Upstream, Norm Cement.

Industries

Oil and gas 
NEQSOL Holding's oil and gas activity is concentrated within two companies registered in the UK: Nobel Oil E&P (known as Nobel Upstream) and Nobel Oil Services (now Nobel Energy).

The latter decided to change its name to Nobel Energy in the framework of a rebranding in December 2021. The Nobel Oil Group is a corporate group operating primarily in Azerbaijan, in the US, and in the UK. The company provides integrated operating services in the oil and gas sector.

This group was founded by Nasib Hasanov in 2005, and later became Nobel Upstream and Nobel Oil Services in 2014.

Construction 
The company owns Norm Cement, a construction-based company launched in 2006. Norm is the largest cement producer in the South Caucasus region.

Telecommunications 

 Bakcell

NEQSOL Holding entered the telecommunications market in 2005 with the acquisition of Azerbaijan's first mobile operator, Bakcell. The company provides a wide range of modern telecommunication (voice and mobile internet) services to more than 3 million customers with approx. 90% coverage of the country's territory.

 Vodafone Ukraine

Vodafone Ukraine (formerly MTS Ukraine) is one of the holding's main subsidiaries. It is the second-largest mobile operator in Ukraine with around 20 million users. In October 2015 Mobile TeleSystems and Vodafone expanded their 2008 strategic partnership; this resulted in the rebranding of MTS Ukraine to Vodafone Ukraine. In 2019, NEQSOL Holding­ acquired 100% of Vodafone Ukraine.

This acquisition of Vodafone Ukraine, made through Backcell, is the first investment of NEQSOL Holding in Ukraine. It was previously owned by MTS belonging to Vladimir Yevtushenkov.

Vodafone Ukraine keeps works under the British Vodafone brand.

In September 2021, NEQSOL appointed Vasyl Latsanych as its Head of Telecom Department.

Since the beginning of the War in Ukraine in February 2022, Vodafone Ukraine experienced a decrease of net value of assets and significant costs related to the military conflict in Ukraine.

In addition, Vodafone Ukraine declared that rebuilding all the telecommunications infrastructures damaged during the war will cost more than 50 million dollars to the company (as of May 2022), not mentioning the loss of consumers.

 Caucasus Online

In 2019, Nasib Hasanov purchased 49% of Caucasus Online (link to Caucasus Online on Wikipedia), allowing NEQSOL's first steps in the internet field. In 2021, NEQSOL Holding purchased the remaining 51% of Caucasus Online from former owner Khvicha Makatsaria.

Although the Georgian National Communication Commission (GNCC) tried to oppose the transaction, the arbitration tribunal dismissed the Georgian authorities’ request and allowed the acquisition by NEQSOL Holding.

Caucasus Online was established in 2006 through the merging of three main Internet Service Providers (ISP): Caucasus Network, Georgia Online and Sanet. Telenet merged with Caucasus Online in 2008. Caucasus Online owns 1.200 km of fiber cable across the Black Sea (the Caucasus Cable System.

Digital Silk Way 
The Digital Silk Way is a project aiming at connecting Europe and Asia through a telecommunications corridor. It was initiated in 2018 and is being implemented by AzerTelecom, one of the holding's subsidiaries.

The project plans to expand telecommunications network in the region, especially connections in the Caspian Sea region including in Azerbaijan, Georgia, Kazakhstan and Turkmenistan.

In 2020, the Digital Silk Way project was selected as one of Asia's top five infrastructure projects by the Global Strategic Infrastructure Leadership Forum held in the US.

The digital infrastructure project was presented at the Dubai Expo organized in the UAE in 2022 at the Azerbaijan Pavillon.

In 2023, in the framework of the Digital silk Way project, AzerTelecom and Kazakhtelecom signed an agreement to link both sides of the Caspian Sea through a subsea cable from Azerbaijan to Kazakhstan.

Award 
The company has been the recipient of several awards over the years including the Brandon Hall Group HCM Excellence Awards on 23 August 2021.

Humanitarian commitments

COVID-19 crisis in 2020 
NEQSOL Holding has donated 1 million dollars in 2020 to fight against the spread of COVID-19 pandemic in Ukraine. The funds allocated were used to purchase medical equipment and systems needed by hospitals.

Conflict in Eastern-Ukraine in 2020 
In 2020, Vodafone Ukraine and the UNHCR started to cooperate in Eastern parts of Ukraine to provide a free access to mobile communications (free talk time) to the most vulnerable populations.

Indeed, the security context combined o the sanitary measures to prevent the spread of COVID-19 led to mobility restrictions in this area.  Vodafone Ukraine provided for 2,489 conflict-affected persons to allow them to stay connected despite their location and the mobility measures in place.

War in Ukraine in 2022 
Since the beginning of the war in Ukraine, NEQSOL Holding has been helping civilians on the ground.

For example, together with 2 other mobile operators (Kyivstar of Veon and Lifecell of Turkcell), Vodafone Ukraine provided for free national roaming. In addition, Vodafone Ukraine has taken precautions before the beginning of the war, resulting in the possibility to keep soldiers and civilians connected despite damages on the telecommunications infrastructures.

At the beginning of the war, NEQSOL Holding and subsidiaries Norm and Bakcell participated in the help for repatriating Azerbaijani citizens from Ukraine. For example, they provided for Azerbaijani citizens free flights from Ukraine, and helped to organize train evacuation.

Turkyie-Syria Earthquake in 2023 
Bakcell, one of NEQSOL Holding's subsidiaries, has sent special equipment to Turkish civilians after the earthquake to help them stay in contact with their families despite the destruction caused by the natural catastrophe. The help includes 13 special installations (cost of 500.000 manats) dedicated to the most damaged areas.

Azerconnect, one of NEQSOL Holding's subsidiaries, announced its support to civilians, victims of the earthquake in Turkey in February 2023. The company has donated 5 million Turkish Liras to the Agency for Natural Disasters and Emergency Situations (AFAD) of the Ministry of Internal Affairs of Turkey.

References

External links 

 Official website of NEQSOL Holding 
 Official website of Bakcell 
 Official website of Vodafone Ukraine 
 Official website of the Digital Silk Way

Telecommunications
Telecommunications companies
Oil and gas companies
Construction companies based in London
Energy
Energy companies